Karpina is a river in Police County in the West Pomeranian Voivodeship. The river flows through Ueckermünde Heath. 

The river flows out of Karpino Lake. Flowing into the Eastern direction through the villages Karpin, Drogoradz and after around 2.5 km flows into the estuary of the river Oder.

The name Karpina was officially introduced in the year 1949, replacing the former German name Karpiner Bach.

References

Geography of West Pomeranian Voivodeship
Rivers of Poland
Rivers of West Pomeranian Voivodeship